Sándor Kónya (23 September 1923 – 20 May 2002)  was a Hungarian tenor, particularly associated with German and Italian roles, especially Lohengrin and Calaf.

Biography 

Kónya was born in Sarkad, Hungary, and began his vocal studies at the Franz Liszt Academy in Budapest, with Ferenc Székelyhidy. He completed his studies first in Detmold with Professor Frederick Husler. In 1946 two German businessmen (Anton Giesert and Alfons Lehmkuhle from Ostbevern) supported him financially after he gave a performance in Bielefeld shortly after the war. It was one of these men who introduced him to the general music director of the Stadthalle in Münster, a Herr Dressel. It was Dressel who sent him to Prof Frederick Husler. (article in Münsterland 21 August 1958) He then studied in Rome with Namcini, and Milan with Rico Lani. He made his professional debut in Bielefeld, as Turiddu in Cavalleria Rusticana, in 1951. It was also here where he sang his first Lohengrin, in 1953. Some years, he appeared as Alexander Konya.

Following engagements at Darmstadt, Stuttgart, and Hamburg, Kónya became a member of the Berlin State Opera, in 1955, where he created the role of Leandro in Henze's König Hirsch. A performance of Nureddin in Peter Cornelius's comic opera Der Barbier von Bagdad, at the Edinburgh Festival in 1956, attracted widespread attention, and his career became more international in scope. Then came his stunning 1958 debut at Bayreuth, as Lohengrin, a part that quickly became one of his signature roles around the world. It was his debut role at the Paris Opéra in 1959. The following year came his La Scala debut, as Parsifal. The same year, his debut at the San Francisco Opera, as Dick Johnson in La Fanciulla del West, won him warm praise, it was followed by Lohengrin, Rodolfo in La Bohème, and Radames in Aida. His Metropolitan Opera debut took place on 28 October 1961 as Lohengrin. In fourteen seasons at the Met, his roles included Radames, Dick Johnson opposite Renata Tebaldi's Minnie, Calaf in Turandot, another signature role, Pinkerton in Madama Butterfly, Stolzing in Die Meistersinger von Nürnberg, Max in Der Freischütz, Erik in Der fliegende Holländer, Cavaradossi in Tosca, and a much appreciated  Edgardo in Lucia di Lammermoor, which he sang in a new 1964 production, opposite Joan Sutherland. Lohengrin was once again his debut role at the London's Royal Opera House, Covent Garden, in 1963.

Gifted with a shining, spinto instrument, Kónya had an easy top register placing him the category known as "jugendlicher heldentenor" while affording him the full plangency of the Italian roles as well. Kónya left only a small number of commercial recordings, including a 1963 Die Fledermaus, under Oskar Danon;  a 1965 Lohengrin, under Erich Leinsdorf, both for RCA Victor, an aria recital for Deutsche Grammophon (Il Trovatore, Meistersinger, Lohengrin, L'elisir d'amore, Martha, etc.), and a recital of songs by Wagner and Verdi, with Otto Guth at the piano (MCA).  He can be heard in a number of live performances, notably as Edgardo, opposite Sutherland.  There is one additional recording (Gala) of Der fliegende Holländer at the Met, a live recording on 16 February 1963 under Karl Böhm, Sandor Konya as Erik with George London as Holländer and Leonie Rysanek as Senta – GL 100.728 the CD includes a Bonus Track as Riccardo in Un Ballo in Maschera – recorded on 20 April 1968 under Thomas Schippers. Konya's 3/14/64 performance at the NY Metropolitan Opera as Rodolfo in La Boheme, was recorded live and still can be heard on Metropolitan Opera Radio.

Sándor Kónya retired to Ibiza, Spain, where he died on 20 May 2002, at the age of 78.

Sources 
 The Metropolitan Opera Encyclopedia, edited by David Hamilton, (Simon and Schuster, 1987). 
 The Metropolitan Opera Guide to recorded Opera, edited by Paul Gruber (W.W. Norton & Company Inc., 1993). 
 Dictionnaire des interprètes et de l'interpretation musicale, Alain Pâris, (Éditions Robert Laffont, 1986). 
Münsterland Zeitung nr. 192, 21 August 1958

External links 
 Video, singing the Verdi Requiem (YouTube)
 Lohengrin

1923 births
2002 deaths
People from Sarkad, Hungary
Hungarian operatic tenors
Franz Liszt Academy of Music alumni
Hochschule für Musik Detmold alumni
20th-century Hungarian male opera singers
Hungarian expatriates in Italy